{{Speciesbox
| name = California roach
| status = LC
| status_system = IUCN3.1
| status_ref = 
| image = California roach (Lavinia symmetricus) netted in Adobe Creek II 2011-07-31.jpg
| taxon = Hesperoleucus symmetricus
| parent_authority = Snyder, 1913
| display_parents = 3
| authority = (S. F. Baird & Girard, 1854)
| synonyms = *Pogonichthys symmetricus Baird & Girard, 1854 Lavinia symmetricus (Baird & Girard, 1854) Hesperoleucus mitrulus Snyder, 1913 Hesperoleucus navarroensis Snyder, 1913 Hesperoleucus parvipinnis Snyder, 1913 Hesperoleucus venustus Snyder, 1913 }}

The California roach (Hesperoleucus symmetricus) is a cyprinid fish native to western North America and abundant in the intermittent streams throughout central California. Once considered the sole member of its genus, it has recently been split into a number of closely related species and subspecies.

Characteristics of fish in the Hesperoleucus symmetricus species complex

These fishes are of a relatively chunky body shape, with a largish head and large eyes, but a small mouth oriented downwards. The color is a darker grayish-bluish above, and a dull silver underneath. During the breeding season, red-orange patches appear on the chin, operculum, and at the bases of pectoral, pelvic, and anal fins. The smallish dorsal fin has 7-10 rays, while the anal fin has 6-9 rays. They never get large, the maximum known being about 11 cm.

Mainly bottom feeders, filamentous algae are the main part of their diet, followed by aquatic insects and crustaceans. They will also opportunistically eat insects and crustaceans at the surface. In turn, they are eaten by other fish, in particular green sunfish.

Spawning occurs mainly from March through June. They move into shallow, flowing water, over bottoms covered with small rocks, and form up into schools. Females lay a few eggs at a time, eventually putting down from 250 to 900 eggs each. The adhesive eggs are laid in crevices, where they stick to the rocks, and then the males fertilize them. The fry continue to dwell in the crevices until they are strong enough to swim actively.

California roaches seem to be resilient fishes that take advantage of the intermittent waters of central California under conditions too difficult for other fishes. As the springtime streams dry up in summer, roaches accumulate in large number in pools, which may be alkaline, hot (up to 95 °F), and low in oxygen. They also seem to cope well with sewage-polluted waters.

The distribution of the species complex comprises the Sacramento River/San Joaquin River drainage, including Pit River and Goose Lake, and many of the small coastal streams (Russian River, Pajaro River, Salinas River, Adobe Creek, Permanente Creek, etc.). Populations in southern California and in Warner Valley, Oregon, may be introductions.

Taxonomic subdivision

In a recent revision of the California roach, previously considered a single species, it was split into four distinct species and two additional subspecies:
 Hesperoleucus parvipinnis — Gualala roach
 Hesperoleucos mitrulus — northern roach
 Hesperoleucus venustus — coastal roach
 H. v. navarroensis — northern coastal roach
 H. v. subditus — southern coastal roach
 Hesperoleucus symmetricus  — California roach
 H. s. symmetricus — California roach
 H. s. serpentinus'' — Red Hills roach

References

External links
UC Davis California Fishes website

Leuciscinae
Fish of the Western United States
Fish of North America
Sacramento River
San Joaquin River
Fish described in 1854
Taxa named by Spencer Fullerton Baird